Kent County is a county located in the U.S. state of Texas. As of the 2020 census, its population was 753, making it the sixth-least populous county in Texas. Its county seat is Jayton. The county was created in 1876 and later organized in 1892. It is named for Andrew Kent, who died at the Battle of the Alamo. Kent County is a prohibition or entirely dry county, one of five remaining in the state.

History timeline

 8000 BC Paleo-Indians were the first inhabitants. Later Native American inhabitants included the Wanderers band of Comanche.
 1872 Ranald S. Mackenzie and his soldiers trounced the Comanches at Treasure Butte, southeast of Clairemont.
 1876 The Texas legislature formed Kent County from Young and Bexar districts. The new county is named after Alamo defender Andrew Kent.
 1888 Cattleman R. L. Rhomberg settled in the new county and named a settlement Clairemont for his daughter, Claire.
 1890 The county census recorded 324 residents.
 1891 A conflict arose between cattle ranchers and farmers who tried to fence their farms against cattle.
 1892 Kent County was organized, with Clairemont as the county seat.
 1900 The county population was 899.
 1909 The Stamford and Northeastern Railway built a line across the county's northeast corner. The railroad, which connected Stamford and Spur, later became part of the Wichita Valley Railroad. The Jayton community was founded.
 1930 The county's population peaked at 3,851.
 1946-1991  Oil was discovered in Kent County in 1946.

Geography

Major highways
  U.S. Highway 380
  State Highway 70
  State Highway 208

Adjacent counties
 Dickens County (north)
 Stonewall County (east)
 Fisher County (southeast)
 Scurry County (south)
 Garza County (west)
 King County (northeast)
 Crosby County (northwest)

Demographics

Note: the US Census treats Hispanic/Latino as an ethnic category. This table excludes Latinos from the racial categories and assigns them to a separate category. Hispanics/Latinos can be of any race.

As of the census of 2000, 859 people, 353 households, and 247 families resided in the county.  The population density was less than 1/km2 (1/sq mi).  The 551 housing units averaged about 0.6 1 per square mile.  The racial makeup of the county was 95.46% White, 0.23% Black or African American, 0.35% Native American, 3.73% from other races, and 0.23% from two or more races.  About 9% of the population were Hispanic or Latino of any race.

Of the 353 households, 26.10% had children under the age of 18 living with them, 61.20% were married couples living together, 5.90% had a female householder with no husband present, and 30.00% were not families. About 28% of all households were made up of individuals, and 14.20% had someone living alone who was 65 years of age or older.  The average household size was 2.33 and the average family size was 2.83.

In the county, the population was distributed as 20.60% under the age of 18, 5.40% from 18 to 24, 21.80% from 25 to 44, 26.80% from 45 to 64, and 25.50% who were 65 years of age or older.  The median age was 47 years. For every 100 females, there were 91.70 males.  For every 100 females age 18 and over, there were 91.60 males.

The median income for a household in the county was $30,433, and for a family was $35,568. Males had a median income of $23,875 versus $20,000 for females. The per capita income for the county was $17,626.  About 9.20% of families and 10.40% of the population were below the poverty line, including 13.10% of those under age 18 and 6.10% of those age 65 or over.

Communities
 Clairemont
 Girard
 Jayton (county seat)

Politics
Republican Drew Springer, Jr., a businessman from Muenster in Cooke County, has since January 2013 represented Kent County in the Texas House of Representatives.

See also

 Dry counties
 Double Mountain Fork Brazos River
 National Register of Historic Places listings in Kent County, Texas
 Recorded Texas Historic Landmarks in Kent County

References

External links
 Kent County government’s website
 
 Kent County Profile from the Texas Association of Counties

 
1876 establishments in Texas
Populated places established in 1876